"Die Young" is a song by American singer and songwriter Kesha. It was released on September 25, 2012, as the lead single from her second studio album, Warrior (2012). Kesha co-wrote the song with its producers, Dr. Luke, Benny Blanco, and Cirkut, with additional writing from Nate Ruess, the lead singer of Fun. Kesha wrote the lyrics after traveling around the world and embarking on a spiritual journey.

"Die Young" charted in multiple countries, debuting at 13 on the Billboard Hot 100 chart in the United States. In its third week, "Die Young" broke into the Hot 100's top-ten, making it Kesha's seventh consecutive top-ten hit as a lead artist since her debut on the chart in 2010 with "Tik Tok" and ninth top-ten hit overall including her collaborations with 3OH!3, Britney Spears, and Nicki Minaj. It eventually peaked at number two, continuing Kesha's string of top-ten singles. The song has also reached the top ten in multiple countries worldwide, including most of the English-speaking world and has received a Platinum certification in five countries.

In December 2012, the song was removed from some radio stations in the wake of the Sandy Hook Elementary School shooting.

Background and composition

Produced primarily by Dr. Luke and Benny Blanco, Kesha worked with the lead singer of fun., Nate Ruess, to write "Die Young". Co-producer Blanco called the song "old hippie rock." The song was written in 2011, after Kesha traveled the world. Before working on her second studio album, she went on a spiritual journey. Recalling experiences of feeding baby lions and swimming with great white sharks, Kesha said, "I got hypnotized, and I just really wanted this record to be really positive, really raw, really vulnerable and about the magic of life." She intends for the song to show her vulnerable side, saying, "I have a lot of growing and evolving to do. I'm definitely not a one-trick pony and I think people are starting to see that more and more."

About the song, she told Carson Daly on 97.1 AMP Radio:
"It's kind of an anthem. It's a celebration song, which I'm obviously known for writing those, but this one, the concept of it was to live each and every single day like it's your last and to always remain having a youthful spirit no matter how old I get...I can sing like a motherf***er! You're going to hear that because I'm also doing this acoustic EP for my fans. Some of the old songs and the new songs."

The song employs Kesha's trademark electropop sounds. "Die Young" spreads acoustic guitar strums, in the progression of C#m-B-E-A, over an uptempo dance beat, while Kesha belts her half-rapped, half-sung vocals on the verses, where she says, "I hear your heart beat to the beat of the drums." Over throbbing percussion, she continues: "Oh what a shame that you came here with someone / So while you're here in my arms / Let's make the most of the night like we're gonna die young." "Die Young" features synth riffs in the new wave style, reminiscent of the Cars and other music in the 1980s. Towards the end of the song, a choir of backing vocals chimes the chorus over a glam rock drum beat.

Critical reception

Seventeen called it "classic Ke$ha", while Robbie Daw of Idolator said, "[I'm] getting a 'if you’ve heard one Ke$ha song, you’ve heard 'em all' vibe, which is unfortunate." In an interview with Rolling Stone, she said she intended to craft songs in the 1970s "cock rock" genre, but Daw felt that her lackluster vocal delivery neither departed from her previous sound nor lived up to the hype. Rolling Stone said that "Die Young" is "the Ke$ha we know and love," and that "it sounds sorta exactly like Taio Cruz". August Brown of the Los Angeles Times agreed, saying the single was, "...no major departure from her classic template of ravey pop spiced with gum-smacking raps and occasional vocal acrobatics." Further, she wrote that "Die Young" had a "stock-and-trade" message, with the title being, "...a fate... less like a thing to be avoided, and more like the goal is to live fast and leave a good-looking corpse." Marc Hogan of Spin wrote that Kesha's usual idiosyncrasies of punk rockers downing shots, transparent in even her worst songs, did not appear on "Die Young", announcing that "this one feels a bit more, well, blah than her previous hits." Perez Hilton posted the song to his blog with the title "Ke$ha's New Single Die Young Is A Killer!", and said, "...[it] has us getting up and dancing like there's no tomorrow." Contactmusic.com noted the song's success on Twitter, where fans tweeted their appreciation. The reviewer also acknowledged Hogan's negative review, saying that a few more plays would convert him to the song. Indie music blog Stereogum said the song was "glorious", "establishing Ke$ha as one of the industry's best new pop songwriters". Sarah Polosky of Vibe said the song's production worked like water, with the message being steadfast, and the beats dangerously addictive. On the lyrics video, she noted similarities between K-pop singer, PSY's 2012 hit, "Gangnam Style". The song's major similarity to Flo Rida's "Good Feeling" has been acknowledged by Billboard. The song has also been compared to "Domino" by Jessie J and "Teenage Dream" by Katy Perry. All three songs have also been produced by Dr. Luke. Conversely, Jessica Sager of Pop Crush made the same comparisons, and also praised the lack of Auto-Tune in "Die Young". Another source to acknowledge the similarities is MTV saying, "So do we think "Die Young" is pushing [Kesha] toward new sonic heights? Not particularly." Entertainment Weekly critic Ray Rahmen lent "Die Young" a positive review, saying it had all "the pop swag of a high-school girl sneaking a bottle of Smirnoff Ice into prom," before praising the song's remix potential. Bill Lamb of About.com was very positive of the song, giving it five out of five stars and claiming the song "defines the moment in pop music" and calling it "flawless".

The song later placed at number 22 on The Village Voices 40th annual Pazz & Jop critics' poll.

Commercial performance
On October 1, 2012, "Die Young" debuted on the Billboard Mainstream Top 40 chart at number 21, marking Kesha's highest ranking debut on that chart. "Die Young" entered the US Billboard Hot 100 at number 13, also debuting at number three on the Digital Songs chart with 188,000 digital downloads sold within its first week. On the Radio Songs chart, the song garnered 31 million hits. On the week ending in October 27, "Die Young" debuted on Billboards Dance Club Songs chart at number 45. In its third week, "Die Young" rose to number eight on the Hot 100, earning Kesha her eighth consecutive top-ten hit on the chart since her debut with "Tik Tok" in 2010. In its fifth week, the song jumped to number four on the chart. For the week ending December 8, 2012, "Die Young" reached its eventual peak of number two, being kept off the top spot by Rihanna's "Diamonds". On track to become her third number one in the country, she began to lose airplay in December 2012, when several radio stations petitioned to stop playing the song due to the Sandy Hook Elementary School shooting; the track subsequently began falling down the charts. Despite this however, "Die Young" became a number one hit on the Mainstream Top 40 chart, earning Kesha her third chart-topper on that chart along with "Your Love Is My Drug" and "Tik Tok" and her sixth top ten hit for that chart as well. As of December 13, 2018, "Die Young" has been certified 4× Platinum in the United States by the Recording Industry Association of America (RIAA) for selling 4 million units in the country alone.

In the United Kingdom, "Die Young" entered the chart at its peak of number ten on issue dated, December 2, 2012. The following week it rose to number seven, becoming her third solo top ten hit and fifth top ten hit overall in the nation.

Removal from radio stations

On December 15, 2012, the day after the Sandy Hook Elementary School shooting occurred, the song was withdrawn from some radio stations, causing "Not Your Fault Kesha" to trend on Twitter. The withdrawal sent out a mixed response online. Responding to the event, Kesha tweeted: "I'm so so so sorry for anyone who has been affected by this tragedy and I understand why my song is now inappropriate. Words cannot express." In a separate tweet, Kesha confessed that she had no control over the lyrical content of the song and was forced to sing it. Despite being credited as a songwriter on the track, she did not contribute to the chorus lyrically, as this part was written by Nate Ruess, although she reaffirmed that she fully resonated with the song's message; the tweet verifying this was later deleted. Before the shooting, "Die Young" peaked at number two on the Billboard Hot 100, but dropped due to this incident as a result of losing airplay, from 167 million listeners to 148 million, losing 19 million listeners. A music source told TMZ that such a drastic airplay drop is rare, the last of such magnitude being seen was following the Dixie Chicks' criticism of George W. Bush. According to Billboard, other songs that saw decreased radio play in the wake of the shooting and got removed from some radio stations included Foster the People's "Pumped Up Kicks" and David Guetta's "Titanium".

Music video

Background and release
The video was directed by Chris Applebaum and Darren Craig but Applebaum withdrew his name from the official credits. To promote the single, two teaser trailers were released online. The first showed a waffle waitress holding a slip of paper inscribed with a capital "R", which resembles the official logo of Rihanna, leading to rumors that Rihanna would possibly be featured on the song. The second video appeared online, after the singer tweeted, "Wanna hint?". It displayed Kesha in the Tokyo Metro, whistling the chorus of "Die Young" An official lyric video was posted to Kesha's Vevo account the day of the single's release. On September 24, 2012, celebrity makeup artist and blogger for People Scott Barnes wrote that he was working with Kesha on the music video for "Die Young". On the video itself and the makeup artistry behind it, he said:
"... I like to blow people’s expectations away, and that means creating something they’ve never seen before — so stay tuned to see what we come up with."

Photographs of Kesha on-set for the filming of the music video leaked online. Jenna Hally Rubenstein of MTV commented: "...Kesha [is] into wearing basically nothing these days...and it's looking like that no-clothes theme has continued." She compared the leaked photographs and the cover art for the single, further comparing it to Cher's body rope, certain professional wrestlers, and Amazon princesses. Kesha announced that the video would be released the following day on November 7.

Concept and synopsis
Playing the role of a cult leader, Kesha and her fictitious disciples raid a hamlet in rural Mexico, engaging in various forms of sexual debauchery. According to Billboard, the video is a shout-out to the Illuminati. Occult symbols ubiquitously associated with the secret society such as the all-seeing eye of Horus, inverted crosses, pentagrams, and triangles pervade the video. Calling the imagery "blatant", Billboard reviewed the video as "tak[ing] the singer's button-pushing ability to dizzying new heights." Sending text messages to her Animals (an affection name bestowed on her fans) in the video, Kesha writes: "We made it… SOUTH OF THE BORDER… they'll never find us here".

Live performances
Kesha has declared that it is important for her, with Warrior and her live performances of "Die Young", to display her vocal ability due to the backlash she has received about using excessive auto-tune. Kesha first performed "Die Young" on October 29, 2012, in El Rey Theatre. Emily Zemler of The Hollywood Reporter reviewed the performance, blogging: "If pop music demands an element of theatrical presentation, then Ke$ha angled toward a literal interpretation of her raucous, sexualized pop songs". DJed by Herick Hell, Kesha performed various other songs including "Party at a Rich Dude's House", "Cannibal", and "We R Who We R". Clad in a rhinestone one-piece, Kesha wore a gold diadem while being carried by muscular cabana boy look-a-likes. The set was rife with green laser beams and giant artificial phalli. On November 6, 2012, Kesha made the song's first televised performance in the fourth season of Australian The X Factor. On November 20, 2012, Kesha performed "Die Young" on Today in New York, NY. The performance was held in the Rockefeller Plaza, and she wore a camouflage leotard adorned with an upside cross and rainbow-colored paper flowers. Along with "Die Young", she performed her other smash hits, "Blow" and "We R Who We R". Billboard congratulated "Die Young"s performance at the American Music Awards of 2012 as being one of the five best performances that night. On December 4, 2012, Kesha performed "Die Young" at the late-night show Conan. For the music journal, Jason Lipshutz wrote:
"Ke$ha's performance of new single "Die Young" was resoundingly Ke$ha-esque: there were flashing neon lasers, skeleton drummer-dancers, an inexplicable headdress at the beginning and a totally explicable crotch-grab in the middle. With blonde pigtails running across her shoulders and black leather boots hiked up to her knees, Ke$ha was often carried on the shoulders of shirtless men with a look of unabashed joy on her face – a fitting image for a single about shirking tomorrow's responsibilities for carnal impulses."

In popular culture
The song was featured in the film Neighbors, appearing in the film's soundtrack.
The song appeared uncredited in the second-season finale of the American adult animated sitcom Solar Opposites. It was also featured in several editions of the Just Dance video game series by Ubisoft, including Just Dance 4, Just Dance 2014, and Just Dance 2015. Independent animator Vivienne Medrano, later creating Hazbin Hotel and Helluva Boss, would make a fan animation for the song, posting it on her YouTube channel. By November 2019, the animation would have over 50 million views.

In 2021, the song became part of a popular TikTok trend in which a person plays the song over a speaker outside of another person's closed door, and the first person bangs on the door to the signature drum beats in the chorus, then flees before the other person can answer the door. Several college campuses have banned this activity due to noise complaints, and police have been called in residential neighborhoods with residents claiming either property damage or assuming a home invasion is happening.

Parodies
In November 2012, the song was parodied by 93.9 iFM and made the title:  named after the viral video incident in the LRT.

Formats and track listings
Digital download
"Die Young" – 3:33

Digital download (Deconstructed mix)
"Die Young" (Deconstructed mix) – 3:21

Digital download (remix)
"Die Young" (remix; featuring Juicy J, Wiz Khalifa and Becky G) – 4:02

German CD and UK digital download
"Die Young" – 3:33
"Die Young" (instrumental) – 3:33

Digital download (EP)
"Die Young" – 3:33
"Die Young" (remix; featuring Juicy J, Wiz Khalifa and Becky G) – 4:02
"Die Young" (Dellas K extended mix) – 5:49
"Die Young" (Dellas K radio edit) – 3:38

Digital download (IC & Nordh extended remix)
"You're Gonna Die Young" (IC & Nordh extended remix; featuring Nervo) – 6:22

Credits and personnel
 Songwriting – Kesha Sebert, Nate Ruess, Lukasz Gottwald, Henry Walter, Benjamin Levin,
 Production, instruments, and programming – Dr. Luke, Benny Blanco, Cirkut

Credits adapted from the liner notes on BMI.

Charts

Weekly charts

Year-end charts

Certifications

Release history

References

External links
 

2012 singles
RCA Records singles
Kemosabe Records singles
Kesha songs
Number-one singles in Lebanon
Songs written by Dr. Luke
Song recordings produced by Dr. Luke
Songs written by Benny Blanco
Song recordings produced by Benny Blanco
Songs written by Kesha
Wiz Khalifa songs
Juicy J songs
Song recordings produced by Cirkut (record producer)
Songs written by Nate Ruess
Songs written by Cirkut (record producer)
Becky G songs
Obscenity controversies in music